The Tongareva triple junction, also called the Pacific-Farallon-Phoenix triple junction, was a geologic triple junction in the southwestern Pacific Basin where three tectonic plates met: the Pacific Plate, the Farallon Plate, and the Phoenix Plate. It existed throughout the mid-Cretaceous period and consisted of three mid-ocean ridges. A volcanic episode from 125 to 120 million years ago created an oceanic plateau east of Samoa called the Manihiki Plateau.

References

Triple junctions
Plate tectonics